Uden is a town and former municipality in the province of North Brabant, Netherlands. Since 2022 it has been part of the new municipality of Maashorst.

History 
Uden was first recorded around 1190 as "Uthen". However, earlier settlements have been found in the areas of the modern day Moleneind, Vorstenburg and Bitswijk and evidence of Ice Age settlements has been found near the hamlet of Slabroek. After 1397 it became a part of the German duchy of Cleves.

Uden was hardly affected by the Eighty Years' War and gained religious freedom in 1631. A result of this was the establishment in the municipality of the Crosiers, who fled from Protestant Dutch oppression in 's-Hertogenbosch in 1638. After the peace of Munster in 1648, Uden remained outside the Dutch republic and was a haven of religious tolerance and Catholics from the nearby towns of Veghel, Nistelrode and Erp were able to build churches at the municipality's boundaries. The period of 1648–1795 saw an increase in prosperity due to the weekly markets, however, the town was almost destroyed by a fire in 1746. The Dutch folk-hero Kobus van der Schlossen was locally active at this time.

In 1795, Uden was taken by French troops and incorporated into the Dutch republic and has been a part of the Kingdom of the Netherlands since 1810. After that time Uden's wealth diminished, mainly due to competition from the neighbouring Brabant towns, resulting in emigration to the Midwestern United States. 

In 1848 The Dominican Catholic missionary Father Theodore J. van den Broek led a group of Dutch Catholics from Uden to Little Chute, Wisconsin, beginning a pattern of immigration to northeast Wisconsin that would last until the early twentieth century. That region of Wisconsin remains largely populated by descendants of Dutch Catholic immigrants from the Uden area. The Midwest was selected for its fairly similar landscape, which allowed the East Dutch immigrants, who were primarily farmers, to continue the same agricultural practices in the United States.

On 12 June 1840, a meteorite weighing approximately 720 grams fell into a field just outside Uden. It narrowly missed a group of laborers digging for peat nearby.

In 1855 the village of Volkel founded its own parish.

Uden began to specialise in the growth of cherries from 1860 onwards and in 1886 the old Petrus-church was demolished by fire and replaced by a new larger one.

During World War I (in which the Netherlands stayed neutral) North Brabant was inundated by Belgian refugees. A refugee camp was erected at Vluchtoord in Uden, which housed several thousand Flemish refugees until 1918.

In the 1920s people started to cultivate the extensive heathlands in the eastern part of the municipality, called "De Peel". In 1922 a new village was built, called Terraveen and later renamed Odiliapeel.

After Uden was struck by a devastating cyclone in 1925, it was visited by Wilhelmina, queen of the Netherlands.

Since the 1950s Uden has become a regional centre of development, providing much needed economic growth. Due to the growth, very little is left of the old town's character.

Population centres 
Odiliapeel
Uden
Volkel

Places of interest

Notable people 

 Theodorus Verhoeven (1907–1990), missionary and archaeologist
 Gerrit Braks (1933–2017), politician and agronomist
 Theodore J. van den Broek, Dominican Catholic Missionary who led a wave of Dutch emigration to the American Midwest, primarily Wisconsin.
 Gerrit van Dijk (1938–2012), animator, filmmaker, actor, and painter
 Cilia van Dijk (born 1941), film producer
 Addy van den Krommenacker (born 1950), fashion designer
 Sultan Günal-Gezer (born 1961), politician, municipal councillor and alderman of Uden
 Martin van Drunen (born 1966), death metal vocalist
 Nikkie de Jager (born 1994), makeup artist and beauty vlogger

Sport 

 Theo Willems (1891–1960), archer, team gold medallist at the 1920 Summer Olympics
 Wilma van den Berg (born 1947), sprinter, competed at the 1968 and 1972 Summer Olympics (which she left in the middle, in sympathy with the Israelis after the Munich Massacre)
 Earnie Stewart (born 1969), American retired soccer player
 Laura de Vaan (born 1980), Paralympian who competes in handcycle events
 Cheryl Maas (born 1984), snowboarder, competed at three Winter Olympics
 Maud van der Meer (born 1992)m swimmer, competed at the 2016 Summer Olympics

People from Uden
U.S. international football player Earnie Stewart was raised in Uden. His father was a U.S. Air Force airman stationed at Volkel Air Base. Fashion designer Addy van den Krommenacker was also born and raised in Uden. Producer Cilia van Dijk was born in Uden in 1941 and raised there. She won an Oscar in 1985 for producing the short animated movie Anna and Bella. The dancing pair Erik van Lieshout (born 1970) and Angelique Bisschops (born 1972) became Dutch Champion in Latin and Ballroom Dancing seven times and Champion of the Benelux four times. One of the more famous inhabitants is 'Sjoerd Snor' or 'Den Poalling', a regular at the bar of one of the more popular cafés in the center of Uden.

International relations 
Uden is twinned with

See also
Volkel Air Base

Gallery

References

External links

Official website

Former municipalities of North Brabant
Populated places in North Brabant
Municipalities of the Netherlands disestablished in 2022
Geography of Maashorst